Theta Borealis Sector is a 1981 role-playing game supplement published by Group One for Traveller.

Contents
Theta Borealis Sector outlines the various worlds and subsectors that make up the Group One Traveller universe.

Publication history
Theta Borealis Sector was published in 1981 by Group One as a 16-page book with a large color map.

Reception
William A. Barton reviewed Theta Borealis Sector in The Space Gamer No. 48. Barton commented that "While there's no great reason for most players to leave the sector in which they're currently adventuring for Theta Borealis Sector [...] the product is well-suited for those who'd prefer some distance between themselves and the Imperium.  And it does show that Group One is working to improve its products."

References

Role-playing game supplements introduced in 1981
Traveller (role-playing game) supplements